Gennaro Ruo (1812 - 1884) was an Italian painter, active in Naples, painting both religious-historical subjects, and portraits.

Biography
He studied, and later taught, painting at the Academy of Fine Arts of Naples.  He obtained a stipend from the Neapolitan authorities to study in Rome circa 1841. Among his pupils at the Academy were Raffaele Armenise, Federico Rossano, and Luigi Medollo.

References

1812 births
1884 deaths
19th-century Italian painters
Italian male painters
Painters from Naples
19th-century Italian male artists